Sulev may refer to:
Super Ultra Low Emission Vehicle
EML Sulev (M312), a minehunter
Sulev (given name)